Commonwealth v. Twitchell, 416 Mass. 114, 617 N.E.2d 609 (1993), was the most prominent of a series of criminal cases, in the late 1980s and early 1990s, in which parents who were members of the Christian Science church were prosecuted for the deaths of children whose medical conditions had been treated only by Christian Science prayer.

In 1988, Massachusetts prosecutors charged David and Ginger Twitchell with manslaughter in the 1986 death of their two-year-old son Robyn. Robyn Twitchell died of a peritonitis caused by a bowel obstruction that medical professionals declared would have been easily correctable.

The Twitchells' defense contended that the couple were within their First Amendment rights to treat their son's illness with prayer and that Massachusetts had recognized this right in an exemption to the statute outlawing child neglect.

The Twitchells were convicted of involuntary manslaughter.  They were sentenced to ten years probation and required to bring their remaining children to regular visits to a pediatrician.  The conviction was overturned in 1993 by the Massachusetts Supreme Judicial Court on a legal technicality. Robert Gittens, speaking for the prosecutors' office commented, "the law is now clear: parents cannot sacrifice the lives of their children in the name of religious freedom."

References

External links
 

Massachusetts state case law
U.S. state criminal case law
1988 in United States case law
Christian Science in Massachusetts
History of Christianity in the United States
1993 in Massachusetts
1993 controversies
Supernatural healing